Reinier Cornelis Bakhuizen van den Brink (30 January 1881, in Pasoeroean – 4 April 1945, in Tjimahi) was a Dutch botanist. He was the son of Henriëtte Maria Raedt van Oldenbarnevelt (1858–1929) and Charles René Bakhuizen van den Brink (1850–1923), and a grandson of the literary critic, historian and philosopher  (1810–1865).
In 1917 he married Djahini from Tjimahi, whom he had met in 1910. Their son Reinier Cornelis (1911–1987) was also a botanist. Brink died in a Japanese internment camp during World War II.

References

1881 births
1945 deaths
People from Pasuruan
20th-century Dutch botanists
19th-century Dutch East Indies people
20th-century Dutch East Indies people
Dutch people who died in Japanese internment camps